Louis François de Pourtalès (4 March 1824 – 18 July 1880) was a Franco-American naturalist, born at Neuchâtel, Switzerland.

Early life and education
Pourtales was born on 4 March 1824 and regarded as a Swiss representative of an old family with linage in France, Prussia, and Bohemia. After the death of his father, he succeeded to the title of Count and inherited a fortune that enabled his scientific pursuits.

He was educated as an engineer. He was regarded as an expert in mathematics, physics and zoology, and had interest in literature, poetry and history.

Death
Pourtales died on 18 July 1880 from an unspecified "obscure internal disease".

Career
Pourtales was a pupil of Louis Agassiz, whom he accompanied in 1840 on glacial expeditions in the Alps and, in 1847, followed Agassiz to immigrate into the United States. In 1848, he entered government service with the Coast Survey and became profoundly interested in the deep sea.  He made some of the first observations of the deep sea bottom and of globigerina. In 1851 he assisted in the triangulation of the Florida Reef, and from 1854 until his resignation in 1873 had special charge of the office and field work of the tidal department of the Coast Survey.

In 1873 he became custodian of the Harvard Museum of Comparative Zoology, in which he had previously been assistant in zoology. He was later appointed Keeper of the Museum of Comparative Zoology, and worked closely with the curator Alexander Agassiz.  L. Agassiz attempted to get him a professorship.

In 1871, Pourtalès published one of his most famous works, Deep Sea Corals based on his memoirs as the first in the United States to undertake deep-sea dredging with USC&GS George S. Blake, and was an authority on marine zoology. A second memoir was published on the results of the Hassler Expedition.

Pourtalès' last work was a report on the Florida Reef.

Honors and awards
The name Pourtalesia was given to a genus of sea urchins as found by the Challenger expedition.

He was a member of the National Academy of Sciences and wrote various contributions to the Coast Survey reports, to Benjamin Silliman's American Journal of Science, and to the Proceedings of the American Association for the Advancement of Science.

Works
He published, under the auspices of the museum, several works, including:
 
 
 
 Corals and Crinoids (1878)
 Report on the Corals and Antipatharia (1880)

References

External links

 
 "Sketch of Count Pourtales", Popular Science Monthly, Volume 18, February 1881
National Academy of Sciences Biographical Memoir

1824 births
1880 deaths
Pourtalès family
People from Neuchâtel
Harvard University staff
American naturalists
Swiss emigrants to the United States
Members of the United States National Academy of Sciences
United States Coast Survey